Surrender is the third studio album by English electronic music duo The Chemical Brothers. It was released on 21 June 1999 in the United Kingdom by Freestyle Dust and Virgin Records and in the United States by Astralwerks. The album saw the duo exploring further various electronic styles, including house music. Four singles were released from the album: "Hey Boy Hey Girl", "Let Forever Be", "Out of Control", and "Music: Response".

Content 

Surrender features guest vocalists Noel Gallagher (Oasis), Hope Sandoval (Mazzy Star), Bernard Sumner (New Order) and Jonathan Donahue (Mercury Rev).

The album is more experimental than previous efforts. 'Let Forever Be' is a clear tribute to The Beatles' 'Tomorrow Never Knows'. "Out of Control" is house influenced, and the breakout single "Hey Boy Hey Girl" has a rave sound.

Of 'The Sunshine Underground', Tom Rowlands said: "I think the title came from those psychedelic poster books. We wanted it to sound like a live band finding its feet. It was influenced by a live version of 'Angel Sigh' on Spiritualized's Fucked Up Inside. It went through a lot of versions and this one's a composite of a lot of different takes. I love the mad bit in the middle when it goes into hyperspace and turns into this huge, gurning monster."

Many of the artists that the duo worked with on this album, they would work with again. The duo were quick to work again with Bobby Gillespie, who appears on the third track and third single "Out of Control": they remixed Gillespie's Primal Scream song "Swstk Ys" (as it was titled on the 1999 single release), which later appeared on the band's 2000 album Xtrmntr.

Surrender was the first Chemical Brothers album not to feature an appearance by Beth Orton, though she would appear on the following album Come with Us, on the song "The State We're In".

Album cover 
The album and singles artwork were provided by London-based silkscreen artist and illustrator Kate Gibb, using screen prints of photographs found in the Hulton Picture Library, Gibb also went on to illustrate the Chemical Brothers albums Come With Us, We Are the Night and Brotherhood. The cover image was a treatment of a photograph called Jesus Amongst the Fans taken by Richard Young at The Great British Music Festival at the Kensington Olympia in 1976. The Jesus in question was a music fan called William Jellett who had adopted the divine moniker and was often seen dancing ecstatically at concerts across the UK from the 1960s to the 1990s, his miracles were to give dried fruit and nuts to strangers. Ed Simons said of the album cover in Q Magazine, "We liked the idea of everyone else sitting down and being chilled out and just one person really getting it, like one of our gigs in the Midwest, actually". The magazine stated, however, in February 1999 the duo were confronted with a novel problem: they had, in Simons' words "about two weeks" to sort out an album cover, plan a live show, and do endless promotional duties in Japan. At one point, the image that was used as the single cover for "Out of Control", released later in 1999, was intended to be the album cover of Surrender.

Release 

The album was the band's second number one album. It was certified 2× Platinum by the BPI on 30 September 2005. A special tour edition of the album was released in Australia and New Zealand, which contained a second disc of B-sides from the album.

Singles 

"Under the Influence" was released in June 1998 on vinyl as "Electronic Battle Weapon 3", exclusively for use for club DJs. "Hey Boy Hey Girl" was released on 31 May 1999 as the first official single from the album. It reached number 3 on the UK Singles Chart. The second single, "Let Forever Be", was released on 2 August 1999 and reached number 9 in the UK Singles Chart.
This was followed by "Out of Control" which was released on 11 October 1999 and reached number 21 in the UK Singles Chart. "Music: Response" was released on 6 March 2000. It was not eligible for the UK charts because it contains five songs instead of three, which is required for qualification.

20th Anniversary Edition 

On 10 June 2019, The Chemical Brothers announced a 20th Anniversary special edition re-release of Surrender, featuring five unreleased "secret psychedelic mixes", a collection of b-sides and remixes, a DVD of restored promo videos, live footage of their performance at Glastonbury 2000, art prints, and a book. The set was released on 3CD and 4xLP on 22 November 2019.

Legacy 

The album cover appeared in Q magazine's 2001 list of "Q's 100 Best Record Covers of All Time". and is ranked number 981 in All-Time Top 1000 Albums (3rd. edition, 2000).

Leeds band The Sunshine Underground took their name from the sixth track on the album.

Track listing 

Note
 As with all other albums by The Chemical Brothers, some of the tracks segue into the next. These are 1 into 2, 2 into 3, 8 into 9, 9 into 10, and finally 10 into 11.

Sample credits
 "Music:Response" contains samples of "Make It Hot", written by Missy "Misdemeanor" Elliott, Tim Mosley and Aleesha Richards, and performed by Nicole.
 "The Sunshine Underground" contains samples of "Asian Workshop", written and performed by James Asher.
 "Got Glint?" contains samples of "Earth Message", written by Bernard Fevre and Jacky Giordano, and performed by Bernard Fevre.
 "Hey Boy Hey Girl" contains samples of "The Roof Is on Fire", written by Gregory Wigfall, Richard Fowler, Charles Pettiford, Celite Evans and Jerry Bloodrock, and performed by Rock Master Scott & the Dynamic Three.

Personnel 
Credits for Surrender adapted from album liner notes.

The Chemical Brothers
 Tom Rowlands – production
 Ed Simons – production

Additional musicians
 Bernard Sumner – vocals and guitar on "Out of Control"
 Bobby Gillespie – additional vocals on "Out of Control"
 Noel Gallagher – vocals on "Let Forever Be"
 Hope Sandoval – vocals on "Asleep from Day"
 Jonathan Donahue – vocals, guitar, and piano on "Dream On"

Additional technical personnel
 Cheeky Paul – editing
 Steve Dub – engineering
 Jon Collyer – engineering (assistant)
 Ray Mascarenas – engineering (assistant)
 Mike Marsh – mastering

Design
 Blue Source – art direction
 The Chemical Brothers – art direction
 Kate Gibb – screen prints

Charts

Weekly charts

Year-end charts

Certifications and sales

Release history

References 

The Chemical Brothers albums
1999 albums
Astralwerks albums
Virgin Records albums